This is a list of marches. In the Middle Ages, marches were any type of borderland between realms, or a neutral zone under joint control of two states. Marches served a political purpose, such as providing warning of military incursions, or regulating cross-border trade.

Northeastern marches
At the beginning of his rule as king of Germany, Otto I tried to reorganize his realm to prepare an expansion to the East. At the beginning of the year 937, he created two marches: the March of the Billungen, given to Hermann Billung, later Duke of Saxony; and the Eastern march, given to Gero. In 961, when Billung became Duke of Saxony, his March was merged with the duchy. In the case of Gero, Otto I, now emperor, decided the division of his territories, greatly expanded since 937.

 March of Billung (937-961): Carved from the Duchy of Saxony, then merged back.
 937-961: Hermann Billung
 Danish March, German buffer zone against the Danes
 March of Gero, sometimes called Nordmark or Ostmark (937-965). Carved from the Duchy of Saxony, then divided in five marches.
 937-965: Gero
 Nordmark, later known as March of Brandenburg (from 965): Carved from the March of Gero.
 965-985: Dietrich von Haldensleben
 985-1003: Lothar I of Walbeck
 Ostmark, sometime confused with Nordmark, or with the Bavarian Ostmark (Austria), later the Margraviate of Lusatia (from 965). Carved from the March of Gero.
 965-979: Thietmar I
 979-993: Hodo I
 993-1015: Gero II
 Meissen, also called March of Thuringia (from 965). Carved from the March of Gero.
 965-979: Wigbert
 979-985: Rikdag
 985-1002: Ekkehard I
 Merseburg (965-982). Carved from the March of Gero, annexed to Meissen.
 965-982: Günther
 Zeitz (965-979). Carved from the March of Gero, annexed to Meissen.
 965-979: Wigger I
 Landsberg (1261–1347), separated from Lusatia, integrated into Meissen (later Saxony).

Northwestern marches
In 861, Charles the Bald, king of France, created two marches to protect his realm from warriors coming from Brittany and Normandy. Both were named March of Neustria, but will be known as March of Brittany and March of Normandy. In 863, the king created the March of Flanders.

 March of Brittany (861-987): Annexed to the Kingdom of France.
 861-866: Robert the Strong
 March of Normandy (861-987): Annexed to the Kingdom of France.
 861-865: Adalhard, Udo of Neustria and Berengar I of Neustria (jointly)
 March of Flanders (863-877): Downgraded to a County afterwards.
 863-877: Baldwin I

Three marches belonging to the Holy Roman Empire were created in the Low Countries:
 March of Antwerp (974-1190): Became part of the Duchy of Brabant.
 March of Ename (974-1033): Captured by Baldwin IV, Count of Flanders and became Imperial Flanders.
 March of Valenciennes (974-1071): Became part of the County of Hainaut.

Southeastern marches
 Ostmark, later raised to a duchy; became known as Austria.
 Styria, later raised to a duchy.
 Carinthia (889-1012), later a duchy.
 Mark an der Sann, later the County of Cilli, then integrated into Styria.
 Mark an der Drau; later integrated into Styria.
 Friuli (776-927)
 Carniola (927-1071): carved from Friuli, annexed to the Patriarchy of Aquileia. Later formed part of the Habsburg domains before being raised to a duchy.
 Windic March, a region of the March of Carniola
 Istria (1062-1209): carved from Carinthia, annexed to the Patriarchate of Aquileia.
 Verona (1061-1250): created by the Emperor as a gift, annexed to Austria.
 Tuscany (931-1173): created by the Italian king Hugh of Arles for his brother, then annexed to the Empire.
 931-936: Boso of Tuscany
 Mantua (1433–1530)
 Ivrea (888-1015): created by Guy III of Spoleto

Southwestern marches
 Spanish March, also named Gothia and Septimania (806-885): Created to protect Frankish heartland from Al-Andalus invasions, merged into Aquitaine.
 806-816: Beggo of Paris
 820-825: Rampon, Count of Barcelona
 826-832: Bernard of Septimania
 832-835: Berengar von Toulouse
 835-844: Bernard of Septimania
Upper March (al-Tagr al-A'la al-Andalusi), centered on Zaragoza: created to protect the Emirate of Cordoba from Frankish coastal and east-Pyrenees invasions.  The northernmost part of the Upper March was called the Distant or Farthest March (al-Tagr al-Aqsa) 
Middle March (al-Tagr al-Awsat), centered on Toledo and later Medinaceli: created to protect the Emirate of Cordoba from invasions from the west-Pyrenees and Asturias.
Lower March (al-Tagr al-Adna), centered on Mérida: created to protect the Emirate of Cordoba from Asturian incursions.
Castile, named for the fortifications typical of a march: created to protect the Asturian kingdom from Cordoban invasions. It developed into a county, then a kingdom.
 Provence (905-1105): From 975 it became a family title, the eldest bearing it. It disappeared after the death of Raymond IV of Toulouse.
 905-936: Hugh of Italy
 936-948: Hugh, Duke of Burgundy
 948-975: Conrad of Burgundy
 975-993: William I of Provence
 993-1005: Rotbold II of Provence
 1005-1014: Rotbold III of Provence
 1014-1037: William III of Provence
 1037-1051: Fulk Bertrand of Provence
 1051-1061: Geoffrey I of Provence
 1061-1094: William Bertrand of Provence
 1094-1105: Raymond IV of Toulouse
 Aquitaine (885-886): Successor to the Spanish March, became a Duchy.
 Bernard Plantapilosa

English marches
 Welsh Marches
 Scottish Marches

March as modern-era regional toponym
 Altmark (Old March), region in northern Saxony-Anhalt
 Altmarkkreis Salzwedel, district of Saxony-Anhalt
 Denmark, a sovereign state
Friuli Venezia Giulia, a region of Italy combining the former regions of Friuli and Venezia Giulia, known in English as the Julian March
 Grenzmark Posen-West Prussia, province of Prussia (1922–1938)
 Hedmark, until 2019 a county of Norway
 Kurmark (Electoral March), former expression for a region in today's western Brandenburg
 Lappmarken, a region and former governorate in northern Sweden
 March of Brandenburg (colloquial, but not official), state of Germany
 Marche, region of Italy
 Mittelmark (Middle March), region in central Brandenburg
 Pomarkku (Påmark), a municipality of Finland
 Potsdam-Mittelmark, district of Brandenburg
 New March, former expression for a region in western Poland
 Steiermark, a province of Austria
 Telemark, until 2019 a county of Norway
 Troms og Finnmark, a county of Norway
 Uckermark, a region in northeastern Brandenburg and southern Vorpommern
 Uckermark (district), a district of Brandenburg

See also
 Commandery (jùn), the equivalent Chinese territory

 
Europe-related lists
Geography-related lists
Marches (country subdivision)